Jan-Olof Ekholm (20 October 1931 – 14 January 2020) was a Swedish detective fiction writer born in Grytnäs, Dalarna, Sweden, also known for some children's literature works. He was one of the members of the presidium of the Swedish Crime Writers' Academy (Svenska Deckarakademin). Ekholm's books have been translated to Norwegian, Danish, German, Russian, Ukrainian, and Czech.

Ekholm died, age 88, on 14 January 2020.

Awards
 Svenska Deckarakademin (Swedish Detective Academy) award in 1979 for his non-fiction work Mälarmördaren.
 Temmelburken detective fiction award in 2000.

Movies
 A movie based on Ekholm's early children's book Hurra för Ludvig Lurifax (1965) was produced in Soviet Union in 1984 under the title Ryzhiy chestnyy vlyublyonnyy (red, honest, in love)
 A Swedish murder mystery movie Sista körningen (1996) was co-written by Jan-Olof Ekholm.

References

External links
 Jan-Olof Ekholm on Svenska Deckarakademins

1931 births
2020 deaths
People from Avesta Municipality
Writers from Dalarna
Swedish crime fiction writers
Swedish children's writers
Swedish-language writers